Anastasija Ražnatović (born May 25, 1998), known professionally just as Anastasija, is a Serbian singer-songwriter and model. She is the daughter of Ceca and Željko Ražnatović. Anastasija pursued her music career with the release of her debut single "Savršen par" in July 2018.

Early life
Ražnatović was born on 25 May 1998 in Belgrade, FR Yugoslavia. She is the daughter of singer Svetlana Ceca Ražnatović and career criminal, politician and the founder of the paramilitary formation Serb Volunteer Guard Željko Ražnatović Arkan. When she was less than two years old, she lost her father, after he was assassinated on 15 January 2000. Ražnatović has an older brother, Veljko, and seven half-siblings from her father's previous relationships. After graduating from high school, she attended business school.

Career
In 2016, Anastasija began modeling for the fur coat brand Inverno Caldo. Pictures of her from the campaign were featured in an article in the February 2018 issue of the British Vogue.

In July 2018, Ražnatović made her recording debut by releasing the single "Savršen par" under her mother's record label Ceca Music. Anastasija herself wrote the song alongside Darko Dimitrov. As of January 2023, the single's music video has accumulated over 68 million views on YouTube. Her next single, titled "Rane", was released in March the following year. It manage to surpass the success of the previous release, collecting million views during the first nine hours and 88 million views overall.

During the 2020, Ražnatović released three singles: "Heroina", "Volim te" and "Promašena". A year later on 25 May, she released the singles "Gotovo" and "Izvini". Subsequently, "Ubica" was released in January 2022. In July that year, Anastasija also collaborated with Serbian recording artist MC Stojan on the single "Dokaz". In October 2022, Anastasija began appearing alongside her family on the reality television show Ceca Show: Ceca i deca broadcast on Blic TV.

Personal life
In March 2022, Ražnatović began dating Serbian footballer Nemanja Gudelj.

In June 2022, she reached one million followers on Instagram, becoming the sixth most followed person in Serbia.

Discography
Singles
 "Savršen par" (2018)
 "Rane" (2019)
 "Volim te" (2020)
 "Promašena" (2020)
 "Heroina" (2020)
 "Gotovo" (2021)
 "Izvini" (2021)
 "Ubica" (2022)
 "Otkaz" (2022) featuring MC Stojan

Awards and nominations

External links

References

1998 births
Living people
Singers from Belgrade
21st-century Serbian women singers
Serbian pop singers
Serbian musicians